Short-chain dehydrogenase/reductase 3 is an enzyme that in humans is encoded by the DHRS3 gene.

References

Further reading